Balgoij or Balgoy is a village in Gelderland, Netherlands, near the river Meuse. It belongs to the Wijchen municipality.

Until 1923, Balgoij was a separate municipality.

The village was first mentioned in 1172 as Balgoie, and means swelling of land near water. In 1840, it was home to 406 people.

Gallery

References 

Former municipalities of Gelderland
Populated places in Gelderland
Wijchen